Eulepidotis addens is a moth of the family Erebidae first described by Francis Walker in 1858. It is found in Saint Kitts, Montserrat, Dominica, Saint Lucia, Saint Vincent, Jamaica, Hispaniola, Puerto Rico, Mexico, Guatemala, Venezuela and Brazil. It was reported from Texas by Ed Knudson and Charles Bordelon in 2004.

The larvae feed on Inga vera.

References

Moths described in 1858
addens
Fauna of Brazil
Moths of South America
Insects of South America
Taxa named by Francis Walker (entomologist)